Ricardo Karam is a Lebanese television presenter, producer, talk-show host, author and public speaker. Over the years, he has created several shows, series and documentaries, and founded RK Productions which has taken charge of producing all his projects, as well as Peacomms and TAKREEM, TAKREEM AMERICA and TAKminds.

Career 
Karam began his career as an apprentice in the early days of the Lebanese radio station  Magic 102. He went on to earn a degree in Chemical Engineering and a master’s in business administration at the American University of Beirut and the Lebanese American University respectively. His first television appearance was in 1992 with Focus on Télé Liban.

Since then, he has interviewed the Dalai Lama, Bill Gates, Farah Diba Pahlavi, Luciano Pavarotti, The Abbé Pierre, Valentino, Andre Agassi and Zaha Hadid.

Karam produced several talk shows, series, and documentaries in Arabic, English, and French.

He published his first book Privileged Encounters in 2000 where he revisits his interviews between 1996 and 2000. In 2005, he published Le Paris Libanais in which he discusses 30 years of history between France and Lebanon, including the Lebanese conflict and the Lebanese Civil War.

In 2020, he launched his own podcast series Conversations with Ricardo Karam  unveiling exclusive interviews and revisiting old favorites.

Karam conducted an interview with President Michel Aoun on the day of Lebanon’s centenary on September 1 of the year 2020– a difficult yet necessary endeavor as channels of communication between the nation and presidency had been compromised for close to a year of crisis. This was made clear by the downpour of questions and comments received as soon as the Presidency announced the interview, with people calling for Karam to voice their concerns and ask the questions that were on everyone’s minds after the series of crises that shook the country.

At the end of 2021 and on the 100th anniversary of the founding of the Military Academy, Ricardo was asked to host the heads of the security services in a TV Special aiming to consolidate patriotism in the hearts of the youth during some of Lebanon's most difficult times.

Spokesmanship 
Ricardo Karam regularly leads seminars and cultural, economic or media forums, both in Lebanon and abroad. He has been a speaker, moderator and panelist at conferences in several countries. He also works to support academic institutions and non-governmental organizations by putting his expertise and network at the service of their work.

In September 2014, Karam’s son Nadim was diagnosed with leukaemia at the age of 3 without any prior symptom. A difficult medical and mental journey followed. Karam dug in his own experience to set an example of determination and family unity in the face of personal upheaval. Nadim’s story gained incredible media attention with messages of support and chains of prayer from across the region.

In 2017, the Iraqi mother of two and the daughter of Karam’s close friend, Farah Jawad Kassab died in dubious circumstances during a plastic surgery procedure in Lebanon. Ricardo Karam took to his social media platforms after the incident, telling Farah’s story and helping it gain regional attention, thus turning it into a case of public opinion. He argued against misinformation and false advertisements, warning against traps and the importance of prudence when seeking proper healthcare.

When former Renault–Nissan–Mitsubishi Alliance CEO Carlos Ghosn was arrested in Japan in 2018, the legal and media turmoil that ensued was like no other. Karam had been a journalistic witness and chronicler of Ghosn’s ascent for close to two decades. Although he never went into the legal aspects of allegations, he drew upon their numerous encounters and his habit of using his platform to shed light on important causes to advocate for Ghosn’s right to a fair trial. In the wake of the controversy that followed Ghosn’s escape in 2019, Karam sat with many news organizations such as the New York Times, Euronews, the Mainichi, NBC News  and CBS News  to discuss the case’s developments and its implications.

Given Lebanon's difficult period in October 2019, Ricardo Karam took to his different digital platforms to combat the negative outpour of news that took over social media. He shared stories of resilience as well as his views and numerous messages aiming to trigger hope, change, and positivity.

He has also taken part in the Dod el Fassad (Against Corruption) national campaign, launched by the Saint-Joseph University and ALDIC with the support of the European Union and Expertise France under the ACT project.

In 2021, Ricardo was chosen by the Global Health Institute at the American University of Beirut to become the ambassador for its yearly cancer awareness and prevention campaign. Being familiar with the struggle, he joined the cause in the spirit of making a difference in so many people's lives.

As of 2023, Ricardo Karam will be joining AUB Board of Trustees after winning the 2022 WAAAUB elections that took place in April.

Awards and recognition 
Karam was awarded the medal of the Lebanese National Order of Merit of the rank of Knight in 2022. He received the Palestinian Medal of Culture, Science and Arts with high distinction in 2021, the French National Order of Merit of the Rank of Knight in 2016, and was awarded the Beirut International Festival Prize in 2012, the Lebanese American University Alumni Achievement Award in 2011, and in that same year, the prize of the Sheikh Ibrahim Bin Mohamad Al Khalifa Center for Culture and Research.

TAKREEM
In 2009, Karam created TAKREEM, which he designed as a platform aiming to promote good ethics in Arabs by honoring those who excel in their fields and who can act as role models for role models. Every year, TAKREEM recognizes the achievements of eight Arabs who have distinguished themselves in the arts, sciences, environment, education, or leadership. Patrons include Noor Al Hussein, Marc Levy, Lakhdar Brahimi, Hanan Ashrawi Barham Salih and Mai bint Mohammed Al Khalifa.

TAKREEM AMERICA 
In 2019, TAKREEM AMERICA was established to connect Arab Americans and Middle Eastern Immigrants to their roots, enabling them to join forces with the thriving youth of their motherland and all those who embody a dynamic, different way of putting the region at the forefront of the international stage with the mission to endorse a much needed change.

TAKminds 
In 2018, Karam launched TAKminds, a space designed to allow change-makers to interact. The new forum was intended to shed light on the societal challenges and obstacles that emerging talents face and try to overcome on a daily basis. TAKminds was created from TAKREEM, to celebrate the talents of the Arab world, and to provide them with a platform where they can connect, and create sustainable communities in the Arab world.

Peacomms 
In 2021, Karam founded Peacomms, a coaching and public speaking training platform through which experienced and skilled professionals provide advice and guidance to help business executives develop their communication skills, thus bettering their overall performance. Peacomms targets selected personalities and tackles executive development, personalized coaching, and team coaching, thus acting as a solid catalyst for both personal and professional growth.

Podcast series 
In his original podcast featured interviews with change-makers. His first guest was HRH Prince Ali bin Hussein of Jordan, son of King Hussein bin Talal and his third wife Queen Alia, half-brother of King Abdullah and President of the West Asian Football Federation, who made bold statements that became the talk of the town. Other prestigious guests followed such as literary Mr. Amine Maalouf, Palestinian political icon Hanan Ashrawi, media figure Baria Alamuddin and Lebanese-American poet, essayist, and visual artist Etel Adnan.

Television series

Documentaries

References 

1960s births
Lebanese television presenters
Living people
Karam family